= Heather A. Wilcoxon =

American contemporary artist

- Born: May 8, 1947 (age 78); Los Angeles, California, U.S.
- Education: BFA, San Francisco Art Institute (1984); MFA, San Francisco Art Institute (1988)
- Occupation: Artist
- Known for: Painting, drawing, printmaking
- Website: www.heatherwilcoxon.com

Heather A. Wilcoxon (born May 8, 1947) is an American contemporary artist. Based in the San Francisco Bay Area, her work, which consists of paintings, drawings, and prints, often addresses social and environmental themes.

== Early life and education ==
Wilcoxon attended the Chouinard Art Institute from 1967 to 1969. She later studied at the San Francisco Art Institute, where she earned a Bachelor of Fine Arts in 1984 and a Master of Fine Arts in 1988.

== Career ==
After completing her studies, Wilcoxon began exhibiting her work in galleries and museums in the United States and abroad. Her art is held in several public collections, including the Fine Arts Museums of San Francisco, the Triton Museum of Art, and the Di Rosa Center for Contemporary Art.

Her practice is based on subjects such as politics, human behavior, and environmental issues.

Wilcoxon has received grants and fellowships from organizations including the Pollock-Krasner Foundation, the Buck Foundation and the Tree of Life Foundation. She has participated in residency programs such as the Djerassi Resident Artists Program and the Stone house Residency Program.

== Artistic style ==
Wilcoxon often works in series and uses layered painting techniques, sometimes painting over earlier works. Her early paintings featured dark, cartoon-like imagery, later evolving toward abstraction. Drawing remains central to her artistic process.

== Awards and recognition ==
Wilcoxon has received several grants and awards, including:

- 2019 – Distinguished Women in the Arts Award, Fresno Art Museum
- 1999, 2003 – Pollock-Krasner Foundation Grants
- 1991, 1998 – Marin Arts Council Grants
- 1998 – Djerassi Resident Artist Program Fellowship
- 2002 – Stone house Residency Program Fellowship
- Buck Foundation Grants (three-time recipient)
- Tree of Life Foundation Grant

== Collections ==
Her work is included in the collections of:

- Fine Arts Museums of San Francisco (Achenbach Foundation for Graphic Arts)
- De Saisset Museum, Santa Clara
- Triton Museum of Art, Santa Clara
- Fresno Art Museum, Fresno
- Di Rosa Center for Contemporary Art, Napa

== Selected exhibitions ==
=== Solo and two-person exhibitions ===
- Home Alone, The Fourth Wall Gallery, Oakland, CA (2024)
- Full Circle (with Gail Spaien), Studio E Gallery, Seattle, WA (2023)
- Unsettled Waters, Studio E Gallery, Seattle, WA (2019)
- At Sea, San Jose Institute of Contemporary Art, San Jose, CA (2017)
- Adrift, Jack Fischer Gallery, San Francisco, CA (2017)
- Dark and Humorous Mind of Heather Wilcoxon, American University, Washington, D.C. (2011)

=== Group exhibitions ===
- Unruly, Museum of Sonoma County, Santa Rosa, CA (2025)
- Figure Telling, Di Rosa Center for Contemporary Art, Napa, CA (2023)
- The Female Gaze, Jack Fischer Gallery, San Francisco, CA (2022)
